Harry Dawson may refer to:
Harry Dawson (association footballer) (1886–?), English footballer
Harry Dawson (Gaelic footballer) (born 1992), Gaelic football player
Harry Dawson (priest), Dean of Niagara
Harry Dawson, cinematographer for the film Corwin

See also
Henry Dawson (disambiguation)
Harold Dawson (disambiguation)